Heliastus is a genus of band-winged grasshoppers in the family Acrididae. There are about 10 described species in Heliastus.

Species
These 10 species belong to the genus Heliastus:
 Heliastus aztecus Saussure, 1884
 Heliastus benjamini Caudell, 1905 (arroyo grasshopper)
 Heliastus cirrhoides Otte, 1984
 Heliastus guanieri Caudell, 1903
 Heliastus infrequens Otte, 1984
 Heliastus obesus Saussure, 1884
 Heliastus rubellus Otte, 1984
 Heliastus rufipennis Liebermann, 1945
 Heliastus subroseus Caudell, 1904 (rose-wing beach grasshopper)
 Heliastus sumichrasti (Saussure, 1861)

References

Further reading

 
 

Oedipodinae
Articles created by Qbugbot